Nor Fazly bin Alias (born 31 May 1981, in Kuala Terengganu) is a Malaysian professional footballer who plays for Felda United in the Malaysia Premier League. He primarily plays as a centre-back but he can also play as a left back.

Club career

Early career
Nor Fazly began his career at his hometown team Terengganu, he played there for 7 seasons, before departing for Pahang at the end of 2007 season. He only played with Pahang for a season, before returned to Terengganu and played for T–Team during 2009 season.

International career
Nor Fazly has represented the Malaysia senior team seven times including one Non-FIFA match and was in Malaysia's 2004 Tiger Cup squad.

Career statistics

Club

International

Honours

Club
Felda United
 Malaysia Premier League: 2018

References

External links
 
 

1981 births
People from Terengganu
Living people
Malaysian footballers
Malaysia international footballers
Terengganu FC players
Sri Pahang FC players
Terengganu F.C. II players
Felda United F.C. players
ATM FA players
Malaysia Super League players
Malaysia Premier League players
Association football defenders